Communist Party of Nepal (2006) was a communist party in Nepal. It was formed in 2006, after a split in the Communist Party of Nepal (Unity Centre-Masal). Bijaya Kumar is the general secretary of the party and Narendra Man KC is the party spokesman.

Soon after its formation, the party merged into the Communist Party of Nepal.

See also
 List of communist parties in Nepal

References

Defunct communist parties in Nepal
Political parties established in 2006
2006 establishments in Nepal
2006 disestablishments in Nepal